Maria Darling is a British voice actress who has provided many character voices for children's television programmes in the United Kingdom and the United States.

Television and film
Dr Otter - Some of the Rabbit Children, Mrs. Canny Body, and additional voices
Fifi and the Flowertots - Violet, Pip, Poppy, and Webby
The Magic Key - Chip, additional voices
Rubbadubbers - Amelia, Sploshy, and Winona
Boj - Bibi
Driver Dan's Story Train - Select female characters
Roary the Racing Car - Roary, Marsha, Cici, Breeze, and Mamma Mia
Franny's Feet - Franny (UK dub)
Bob the Builder - Dizzy, Roley, Trix (US version)
Miss Spider's Sunny Patch Friends - Miss Spider, Dragon, Snowdrop, Pansy, Shimmer, Betty, Eunice (UK dub)
The Backyardigans - Tyrone, Tasha (Series 1-2) (UK dub)
Pitt and Kantrop - Pitt
Watership Down - Pipkin, Hannah, Clover, additional voices (Series 3 only)
Boblins - Pinny, Gully and Onny
Odd Jobbers - Mia and Menic the goat
The Mole Sisters - All character voices in the programme
Zoo Troop - Anxious the Elephant and Polly
The Koala Brothers (Audiobooks) - Narrator
Wide-Eye - Little Hoot, Hetty Hornet, The Natterjack Toads, Conchita, and Batwing
Muffin The Mule (2005 version) - All of the female characters except for Louise the Lamb
PB Bear and Friends - Milly the Monkey
Guess with Jess - Billie
Professor Layton and the Eternal Diva - Luke Triton, Annie Dretche
Chuggington - Vee, Lori (Series 1-5)
Jelly Jamm - Goomo
Cartoonito - Cuba, Lolly, Ringo (until 2018)
Bimble's Bucket - Narrator, additional voices (1997-1998)
Bitz and Bob - voices of Purl and Pop
Yoko! Jakamoko! Toto! - Additional voices
Gordon the Garden Gnome - Rosie
Tad, The Lost Explorer - Young Tad Stones
Rudi and Trudi - Additional voices
The King's Beard - Sophie
Little Robots - Rusty and Noisy (US dub)

Video games
Ape Escape 3 - Aki, Sayaka (UK version)
Everybody's Golf: World Tour - Bonnie
Everybody's Golf Portable 2 - Gloria, Mia Cara, Frau Ada
Everybody's Tennis Portable - Gloria, Natasha
Dragon Quest VIII: Journey of the Cursed King
Kingdom o' Magic
Medieval II: Total War
PC Play & Learn - All voices
PlayStation All-Stars Battle Royale - Charu
Professor Layton Series - Luke Triton (UK dub)
Overlord 2
Inazuma Eleven - Mark Evans
Inazuma Eleven 2 - Mark Evans
Inazuma Eleven Strikers - Mark Evans
The Secret World - Lilith

Other
In 2002, she guest starred in the Bernice Summerfield audio drama The Green-Eyed Monsters.

References

External links

Living people
20th-century English actresses
21st-century English actresses
English television actresses
English radio actresses
English video game actresses
English voice actresses
Year of birth missing (living people)